Khagraghat Road is a railway station on the Barharwa–Azimganj–Katwa loop in Baharampur  city and is located in Murshidabad district in the Indian state of West Bengal. Khagraghat Road serves western side of Baharampur.

History
In 1913, the Hooghly–Katwa Railway constructed a  broad gauge line from Bandel to Katwa, and the Barharwa–Azimganj–Katwa Railway constructed the  broad gauge Barharwa–Azimganj–Katwa loop. With the construction of the Farakka Barrage and opening of the railway bridge in 1971, the railway communication picture of the area completely changed.

The rail distance between Berhampore and Sealdah is approximately 205 km.

Location 
KhagraGhat Road railway station lies on the Western Bank of River Bhagirathi (Ganga) in the Radharghat locality of Berhampore city. The line passes through Howrah–Chandannagar-Chuchura-Bandel-Nabadwip-Katwa-Salar-Khagraghat-Azimganj. It is located in Murshidabad district,  from Howrah railway station.
It is one of the important railway stations in Murshidabad and is second important station in Berhampore(the other being Berhampore Court railway station) town which lies on the Eastern side of Bhagirathi river. People from maximum part of Southern Murshidabad district board from this station to reach North Bengal.

Major trains

Some of the important trains that runs from Khagraghat Road are:

 Katwa Jn–Azimganj Jn DEMU Passenger
 Nimtita–Katwa Jn DEMU Passenger
 RampurHat–Katwa Jn Memu Passenger (via Azimganj Jn)
 Sealdah–Jangipur Road Memu Passenger
 Puri–Howrah–Kamakhya Express (via Bandel, Katwa, Berhampore (KhagraGhat), Azimganj, Malda, New Jalpaiguri)
 Sealdah–New AlipurDuar Teesta–Torsa Express (via Naihati, Bandel, Katwa, Berhampore (KhagraGhat), Azimganj, Malda, New Jalpaiguri)
 Sealdah–Haldibari link Teesta–Torsa Express (via Naihati, Bandel, Katwa, Berhampore (KhagraGhat), Azimganj, Malda, New Jalpaiguri)
 Howrah–Malda Town Intercity Express (via Azimganj Jn)
 Howrah–Azimganj Jn DEMU Passenger
 Howrah–Dibrugarh Kamrup Express (via Bandel, Katwa, Berhampore (KhagraGhat), Azimganj, Malda, New Jalpaiguri)
 Kolkata–Radhikapur Express (via Naihati, Bandel, Berhampore (KhagraGhat), Katwa, Azimganj, Malda)
 Sealdah–Saharsa Jn HateyBazare Express (via Naihati, Bandel, Katwa, Berhampore (KhagraGhat), Azimganj, Malda, Purnia)
 Sealdah–Saharsa Jn HateyBazare Express (via Naihati, Bandel, Katwa, Berhampore (KhagraGhat), Azimganj, Malda)
 Howrah–Katihar Express (via Bandel, Katwa, Berhampore (KhagraGhat), Azimganj, Malda)
 Digha–Howrah–New Jalpaiguri Paharia Express (via Kanthi, Howrah, Bandel, Katwa, Berhampore (KhagraGhat), Azimganj, Malda)

Infrastructure 
The railway station has currently 4 platforms.

Time table 
UP TRAINS
13145 Kolkata–Radhikapur Express (Kolkata, Bandel, Katwa,  Berhampore (KhagraGhat), Azimganj, Malda, Radhikapur)
13169 Sealdah–Saharsa Jn Hatey Bazrare Express via Purnia (Tuesday and Thursday)(Sealdah, Bandel, Katwa, Berhampore (KhagraGhat), Azimganj, Malda, Purnia, Saharsa Jn)
13163 Sealdah–Saharsa Jn Hatey Bazrare Express (Sunday, Monday, Wednesday, Friday and Saturday) (Sealdah, Bandel, Katwa, Berhampore (KhagraGhat), Azimganj, Malda, Saharsa Jn)
15721 Digha–New Jalpaiguri Paharia Express (Saturday from Digha) (Digha, Howrah, Bandel, Katwa, Berhampore (KhagraGhat), Azimganj, Malda, NJP (on Sunday))
13033 Howrah–Katihar Express (Howrah, Bandel, Katwa, Berhampore (KhagraGhat), Azimganj, Malda, Katihar)
13421 Nabadwip Dham-Malda Town Express (Nabadwip, Katwa, Berhampore (KhagraGhat), Azimganj, Malda)
53435 Katwa–Azimganj Passenger (Katwa, Berhampore (KhagraGhat), Azimganj)
53005 Katwa–Azimganj Passenger (Katwa, Berhampore (KhagraGhat), Azimganj)
53007 Katwa-RampurHat Passenger (Katwa, Berhampore (KhagraGhat), Azimganj, Nalhati, RampurHat)
73151 Sealdah–Jangipur DEMU Passenger (Sealdah, Naihati, Bandel, Katwa, Berhampore (KhagraGhat), Azimganj, Jangipur)
15643 Puri–Kamakhya Express (Saturday from Puri) (Puri, Bhubaneswar, Kharagpur, Howrah, Bandel, Katwa, Berhampore (KhagraGhat), Azimganj, Malda, New Jalpaiguri, AlipurDuar, Kamakhya (on Monday))
53009 Katwa–Azimganj Passenger (Katwa, Berhampore (KhagraGhat), Azimganj)
73035 Katwa-Nimtita Passenger (Katwa, Berhampore (KhagraGhat), Azimganj, Jangipur, Nimtita)
53011 Katwa–Azimganj Passenger (Katwa, Berhampore (KhagraGhat), Azimganj)
73031 Katwa–Azimganj Passenger (Katwa, Berhampore (KhagraGhat), Azimganj)
53013 Katwa–Azimganj Passenger (Katwa, Berhampore (KhagraGhat), Azimganj)
13141 Sealdah–New AlipurDuar Teesta Torsha Express (Sealdah, Naihati, Bandel, Katwa, Berhampore (KhagraGhat), Azimganj, Malda, New Jalpaiguri, New AlipurDuar)
13465 Howrah–Malda Town Intercity Express (Howrah, Bandel, Berhampore (KhagraGhat), Azimganj, Mald)
53015 Katwa–Azimganj Passenger (Katwa, Berhampore (KhagraGhat), Azimganj)
53017 Katwa–Azimganj Passenger (Katwa, Berhampore (KhagraGhat), Azimganj)
53001 Howrah–Azimganj Passenger (Howrah, Bandel, Katwa, Berhampore (KhagraGhat), Azimganj)
15959 Howrah–Dibrugarh Kamrup Express (Howrah, Bandel, Katwa, Berhampore (KhagraGhat), Azimganj, Malda,  New Jalpaiguri, New AlipurDuar, Guwahati, Dibrugarh)
53019 Katwa–Azimganj Passenger (Katwa, Berhampore (KhagraGhat), Azimganj)

References

External links
 

Railway stations in Murshidabad district
Howrah railway division